Sargus rufipes is a European species of soldier fly.

References

Stratiomyidae
Diptera of Europe
Insects described in 1854
Taxa named by Peter Fredrik Wahlberg